Slavery in Europe may refer to:

 Atlantic slave trade (involving Europe)
 Slavery in medieval Europe
 Slavery in modern Europe
 Slavery in circa-WWII Europe

See also
:Category:Slavery in Europe for a list of slavery by particular country topics